A lynching postcard is a postcard bearing the photograph of a lynching—a vigilante murder usually motivated by racial hatred—intended to be distributed, collected, or kept as a souvenir. Often a lynching postcard would be inscribed with racist text or poems. Lynching postcards were in widespread production for more than fifty years in the United States; although their distribution through the United States Postal Service was banned in 1908.

Description 

Terror lynchings as a display of racial domination peaked around the 1880s through to the 1940s, and were less frequent until the 1970s, especially (but not exclusively) in the Southern United States. Lynchings were widely used to intimidate recently emancipated African Americans after the Civil War Reconstruction era, and were later used to intimidate voters and civil rights workers of all ethnic backgrounds. Mostly African-American men, women, and children were lynched, for a lack of subservience or for success in business. Others were often accused of crimes and forcibly removed from their homes or jails to be murdered by a white supremacist mob without due process or presumption of innocence.

Spectators sold one another souvenirs including postcards. Often the photographer was one of the killers.

In a typical lynching postcard, the victim is displayed prominently at the center of the shot, while smiling spectators, often including children, crowd the margins of the frame, posing for the camera to prove their presence. Facial expressions suggesting remorse, guilt, shame, or regret are rare.

Cultural significance 
Some purchasers used lynching postcards as ordinary postcards, communicating unrelated events to friends and relatives. Others resold lynching postcards at a profit. Still others collected them as historical objects or racist paraphernalia: their manufacture and continued distribution was part of white supremacist culture, and has been likened to "bigot pornography".

Whatever their use, the cultural message embodied in most lynching postcards was one of racial superiority. Historian Amy Louise Wood argues:

 Viewed from an outsider's perspective, bereft of local context, the postcards symbolized white power more generally. White citizens were depicted as victorious over powerless murdered black victims, and the pictures became part of secular iconography.

Richard Lacayo, writing for Time magazine, noted in 2000:

As late as the 21st century, James Allen was able to acquire a collection of lynching postcards from dealers who offered them in whispered tones and clandestine marketplaces.

Legality 
Some towns had censored lynching photographs earlier in the 20th century, but the first step toward nationwide censorship came in 1908. The 1873 Comstock Act had forbidden the publication of "obscene matter as well as its circulation in the mails". In 1908, §3893 was added to the Comstock Act, extending the ban to material "tending to incite arson, murder, or assassination". Although this act did not explicitly ban lynching postcards themselves, it banned the racist text that often accompanied them, which made "too explicit what was always implicit in lynchings".

Despite the amendment, the distribution of lynching photographs and postcards continued, now concealed within envelopes or mail wrappers.

Lynching Postcards: Token of a Great Day 
The 2021 documentary short Lynching Postcards: Token of a Great Day documents said souvenirs.

See also 
 
 Lynching of Laura and L. D. Nelson
 Lynching of Leo Frank
 Lynching in the United States § Photographic records and postcards
 Nazi memorabilia
 Murderabilia

References

Sources

Further reading
 
 Lynching Postcards on IMDb
 Official trailer

Lynching in the United States
Memorabilia
Postcards
History of postcards in the United States
Racially motivated violence against African Americans
Racially motivated violence in the United States
White supremacy in the United States
Postal history of the United States